is a passenger railway station located in the city of Bizen, Okayama Prefecture, Japan, operated by the West Japan Railway Company (JR West).

Lines

Station layout
The station consists of one side platform and one island platform and three tracks. The station building is on the side of Platform 1 of the side platform, and there are two crew accommodations next to the station building. The island platform has Platform 2 and 3 and is connected by a footbridge. The station is unattended.

Platforms

Adjacent stations

History
Bizen-Katakami Station was opened on 25 March 1958. With the privatization of Japanese National Railways (JNR) on 1 April 1987, the station came under the control of JR West.

Passenger statistics
In fiscal 2019, the station was used by an average of 150 passengers daily

Surrounding area
Bizen City Hall
Japan National Route 2

See also
List of railway stations in Japan

References

External links

 JR West Station Official Site

Railway stations in Okayama Prefecture
Akō Line
Railway stations in Japan opened in 1958
Bizen, Okayama